The year 1790 in architecture involved some significant architectural events and new buildings.

Events
 date unknown – Work begins on the East India Company's Plantation House in Saint Helena, which remains the official residence of the Governor.

Buildings and structures

Buildings completed
 New church of the Abbey of St Genevieve in Paris, designed by Jacques-Germain Soufflot and finished by Jean-Baptiste Rondelet, is completed to serve as the Panthéon.
 Estrela Basilica in Lisbon.
 All Saints church, Wellington, Shropshire, England, designed by George Steuart.
 Royal Observatory in Madrid, designed by Juan de Villanueva.
 The Pitot House, New Orleans built by Don Santiago Lorreins (bought by James Pitot in 1809).
 The John Dodd Hat Shop in Danbury, Connecticut, built by lawyer John Dodd.
 The bridge at Warwick Castle, England.
 Monmouth County Gaol, UK, designed by William Blackburn.

Births
 May 4 – Archibald Simpson, Scottish architect practicing in Aberdeen (died 1847)
 November 7 – Karol Podczaszyński, Polish neoclassical architect (died 1860)

Deaths
 February 16 – John Hawks, American architect (born c.1731)
 November 11 – Nicolò Pacassi, Austrian architect (born 1716)

References

Architecture
Years in architecture
18th-century architecture